Allsvenskan is the Swedish second division in women's team handball. Earlier, the name was used by the top division. The league is organized by the Swedish Handball Federation.

References

Sweden, men
Handall Allsvenskan, men
Women's sports leagues in Sweden
Professional sports leagues in Sweden